Lucas Paul Knecht (born 30 March 1993) is a football player who holds the record as the youngest ever player in a men's international match. He made his debut for the Northern Mariana Islands national team aged 14 years and 2 days.

Early life
Knecht played youth soccer with MP United.

College career
Having already made his international debut, Knecht went on to study at the Mount Albert Grammar School in New Zealand, before moving to America to study at the Georgia Southwestern State University, playing for the Hurricanes soccer team. He made 8 appearances during his time there, without scoring.

Club career
After leaving the Georgia Southwestern State University, it is unclear as to whether Knecht joined a club side, with some reports claiming he played for 3. Liga outfit VfL Osnabrück.

International career
He started playing youth international football with the Northern Mariana Islands when he was 13, being selected for a U14 tournament in Beijing, China.

He played in Northern Mariana Islands men's first international soccer victory.

Knecht holds the record for being the youngest ever male international footballer, when he made his Northern Mariana Islands debut aged just 14 years and 2 days against Guam in a 9–0 defeat on 1 April 2007. Since then, he has made 11 appearances for the Blue Ayuyu. He played in all three games as his nation failed to qualify for the 2014 AFC Challenge Cup.

Career statistics

International

References

External links
 

Living people
Northern Mariana Islands footballers
Northern Mariana Islands international footballers
1993 births
Association football defenders